James Marsh may refer to:

 James Marsh (artist) (born 1946), English artist
 James Marsh (chemist) (1794–1846), British chemist
 James Marsh (cricketer) (1870–1930), English cricketer and clergyman
 James Marsh (director) (born 1963), British film director
 James Marsh (British Army officer) (died 1804), British general
 James Marsh (philosopher) (1794–1842), American Christian transcendentalist philosopher and president of the University of Vermont
 James Marsh (priest) (1848–?), English Anglican priest
 James Barney Marsh (1856–1936), American engineer and bridge designer
 James Harley Marsh (born 1943), Canadian editor and writer
 James Holt Marsh (1866–1928), rugby union footballer of the 1880s, and 1890s for Scotland, England, Edinburgh Institute F.P., and Swinton
 James Randall Marsh (1896–1965), American artist
 Jim Marsh (ice hockey) (born 1951), Canadian ice hockey player
 Jim Marsh (American football), American football coach in the United States
 Jim Marsh (basketball) (1946–2019), American basketball player
 James Marsh (basketball) (born 1970), American-German player for the Germany national basketball team
 Jamie Marsh (born 1966), American actor
James Marsh (comedian), known as Jimmy Jewel